MELD may refer to:

 Model for End-Stage Liver Disease, a prognostic model
 A variant of the declarative language CycL
 Molecular energy-level diagram, a type of one-dimensional plot with a significant qualitative aspect, used in chemical energetics
 Movement for a Europe of Liberties and Democracy, a political party at European level

See also
 Meld (disambiguation)